Eisfeld is a German surname. Notable people with the surname include:

Rainer Eisfeld (born 1941), German political scientist and writer
Theodore Eisfeld (1816–1882), American conductor
Thomas Eisfeld (born 1993), German footballer
Walter Eisfeld (1905–1940), German Nazi SS concentration camp commandant

German-language surnames